Novoshilikovo (Yañı Şilek) is a rural locality (a village) in Tangatarovsky Selsoviet, Burayevsky District, Bashkortostan, Russia. The population was 46 as of 2010. There is one street.

Geography 
Novoshilikovo is located 38 km southwest of Burayevo (the district's administrative centre) by road. Davlekanovo is the nearest rural locality.

References 

Rural localities in Burayevsky District